Georgianna Robertson (March 23, 1972, Port Maria, Jamaica) is a Jamaican-born model and actress. She has appeared on over  covers of Spanish, French and Italian editions of Elle and Vogue Paris. Robertson walked numerous of fashion shows, including Jean Paul Gaultier, Yves Saint Laurent, Carolina Herrera, Ralph Lauren, and the 1997 Victoria's Secret Fashion Show.

Trivia 
 Robertson came to New York at age 12. She has one older brother, six younger brothers and three sisters.
 She was a muse of Yves Saint Laurent and one of his favourite models.
 She starred in Prêt-à-Porter, Save the Rabbit and Double Zero. She was also featured in Ini Kamoze's "Here Comes the Hotstepper" and Stevie Wonder's "When Robbins Will Sing" music videos.
 She has her own swimwear line called GEORGIANNA ROBERTSON.
 On the first cycle of Scandinavia's Next Top Model, she performed a similar role to that of Tyra Banks in the original series of the show.

References

External links
See Georgianna Robertson at: Fashion Model Directory

1972 births
Jamaican female models
Living people
People from Saint Mary Parish, Jamaica